Eyes of Love (French: Les yeux de l'amour) is a 1959 French-Italian romantic drama film directed by Denys de La Patellière and starring Danielle Darrieux, Jean-Claude Brialy and Françoise Rosay.

The film's sets were designed by the art director Paul-Louis Boutié.

Synopsis
During the German occupation of World War II, an unmarried woman living with her domineering mother shelters a younger, blind man from the Germans and the two fall in love.

Cast
 Danielle Darrieux as Jeanne Moncatel
 Jean-Claude Brialy as Pierre Ségur
 Françoise Rosay a Mme Moncatel
 Bernard Blier as Le docteur Andrieux
 André Reybaz as Le curé
 Eva Damien as Denise
 Louis Seigner as Le chirurgien
 Marie Mergey as La concierge
 Dominique Zardi as Un badaud à la gare 
 Suzanne Nivette	
 Pierre Vernier
 Nicole Desailly	
 Gisèle Grimm

References

Bibliography 
 Dayna Oscherwitz & MaryEllen Higgins. The A to Z of French Cinema. Scarecrow Press, 2009.

External links 
 

1959 films
1959 drama films
French drama films
Italian drama films
1950s French-language films
Films directed by Denys de La Patellière
Pathé films
Films with screenplays by Michel Audiard
Films with screenplays by Roland Laudenbach
1950s French films
1950s Italian films